Jochberg is a municipality in the Austrian state of Tyrol in the Kitzbühel district. It is located is 8 km south of Kitzbühel.

Population

Economy
There used to be copper mining in Jochberg, until it was ceased in 1625 for lack of profitability. Nowadays Jochberg is part of the Kitzbühel ski resort, connecting the Kitzbühel skiing area to the slopes west of the Pass Thurn.

References

External links

Kitzbühel Alps
Cities and towns in Kitzbühel District